The Embassy of the United Kingdom (commonly referred to as the British Embassy) in Israel is located in Tel Aviv and is the chief diplomatic mission of the United Kingdom in Israel. It is located on Hayarkon Street in the Old North area of the city. Neil Wigan has been British Ambassador to Israel since 13 June 2019.

The United Kingdom also maintains a Consulate-General in East Jerusalem, with a Consul-General not being accredited to any state, as "an expression of [the UK] view that no state has sovereignty over Jerusalem". The United Kingdom also has an honorary consul in Eilat.

History
In 2009, the United Kingdom had planned to move the British Embassy from its location on Hayarkon Street to the Kirya Tower. However, the Foreign Office dropped plans to move the embassy into the skyscraper because of concerns over the building's owners in 2009: the building is part-owned by Africa-Israel Investments Ltd, a company which has built in the Palestinian territories. Israel's ambassador to London said the decision was "appeasement to those who slander Israel".

See also
Israel–United Kingdom relations
List of diplomatic missions in Israel
List of Ambassadors of the United Kingdom to Israel

References

Tel Aviv
United Kingdom
Israel–United Kingdom relations